Tamás Sipos (15 December 1931 – 20 June 2002) was a Hungarian writer and sports commentator. His book of biographical fiction, Dohánybarna selyemmellény (1984), is based on his travails during the Nazi occupation of Hungary, during which he was imprisoned in a work camp and narrowly escaped death.

Works in Hungarian
A harmadik menet (1982)
Dohánybarna selyemmellény (1984)
A pénz istállója (1986) film(?)
A tökéletes bűntény (1989)
Térdig napsütésben (1995)

References 

1931 births
2002 deaths
Hungarian writers